Surya Prasad Pathak is a Nepalese Politician and serving as the Member Of House Of Representatives (Nepal) elected from Baglung-1, Province No. 4. He is member of the Nepal Communist Party.

References

Living people
Nepal MPs 2017–2022
Nepal Communist Party (NCP) politicians
Communist Party of Nepal (Unified Marxist–Leninist) politicians
1976 births